Harry Entwistle (born 31 May 1940) is an English-born Australian priest of the Catholic Church who was the first ordinary of the Personal Ordinariate of Our Lady of the Southern Cross (2012–2019).

Early life
Entwistle was born on 31 May 1940. He studied theology for ordination at St Chad's Theological College, University of Durham.

Ordained ministry

Anglican
Entwistle was ordained a priest in the Church of England Diocese of Blackburn in 1964. After various parish appointments in Lancashire, he became a prison chaplain, serving at HMP Wandsworth from 1981 to 1988. He migrated to Australia in 1988 and continued his parish and prison ministry in the Diocese of Perth of the Anglican Church of Australia. He entered the Anglican Catholic Church in Australia, a member church of the Traditional Anglican Communion, in 2006. He served as Western Regional Bishop of that church from 2006 to 2012.

Roman Catholic
After reception into the Roman Catholic Church and ordination as a deacon, Entwistle was ordained to the priesthood at St Mary's Cathedral, Perth, on 15 June, 2012. On the same day he was appointed Ordinary of the Personal Ordinariate of Our Lady of the Southern Cross. Entwistle was granted the title of Monsignor by Pope Benedict XVI in one of his last acts before retirement.

References

External links 

 Personal Ordinariate of Our Lady of the Southern Cross website

1940 births
Living people
Anglo-Catholic bishops
Anglican bishop converts to Roman Catholicism
21st-century Australian Roman Catholic priests
Prison chaplains
Alumni of St Chad's College, Durham
21st-century Anglican bishops in Australia
People of the personal ordinariates
English Anglo-Catholics
Australian Anglo-Catholics
Anglican chaplains
20th-century English Anglican priests